Kratochwil is the German spelling of the Czech/Slovak surname Kratochvíl. Notable people with the surname include:

 Friedrich Kratochwil, German professor of political studies and political writer
 Siegfried L. Kratochwil (1916–2005), Austrian painter and poet
 Veronika Kratochwil, Austrian diver

See also
 Thomas R. Kratochwill

German-language surnames